The Continental Center is an office skyscraper located in the Financial District of Manhattan, New York City.

History
Originally designed for an insurance company, the building is occupied by major financial and legal firms. The octagonal floor of the building and the glass facade contrast with the neighboring high-rise skyscrapers, such as 120 Wall Street and One Chase Manhattan Plaza. In addition to offices, the building includes a cafeteria, an auditorium and classrooms for use by the occupants.

References

External links
A View on Cities listing for the Continental Center
Emporis listing for the Continental Center

1983 establishments in New York City
Financial District, Manhattan
Office buildings completed in 1983
Skyscraper office buildings in Manhattan
Wall Street